Samuele Vignato (born 24 February 2004) is an Italian professional footballer who plays as an attacking midfielder for  club Monza.

Early life
Vignato was born on 24 February 2004 in Negrar in the Province of Verona, Italy, to Italian father Davide and a Brazilian mother Shèrida. Having begun playing youth football at local club Pieve, Vignato joined ChievoVerona's youth sector aged six.

Club career

ChievoVerona
After having played for ChievoVerona's under-17s, Vignato was promoted to their Primavera (under-19) side, scoring 14 goals and making 11 assists in 18 games in the  season. He made his first-team debut for Chievo on 4 May 2021, as a 76th-minute substitute in a Serie B game against Cremonese. Vignato finished the season with two league games, having also played against Virtus Entella as a substitute.

Monza
On 11 August 2021, Vignato joined Serie B side Monza on a three-year deal. He made his debut on 29 August, playing the first half of a 1–0 league win against Cremonese. On 25 September, Vignato scored his first professional goal, in a 3–1 Serie B win against Pordenone. He became the first player born in 2004 to score in an Italian professional league.

On 25 February 2022, Vignato's contract was extended until 30 June 2025. After having helped Monza gain promotion to the Serie A for the first time in their history, Vignato made his Italian top-flight debut in the 2022–23 Serie A on 7 November 2022, as a stoppage-time substitute in a 2–0 home win against Hellas Verona.

International career 
Eligible to also represent Brazil internationally, Vignato played for Italy at under-15, under-16 and under-18 levels. Having played 16 games for the under-16s, Vignato made his under-18 debut in a friendly against Austria in June 2021.

Vignato was first called up to the under-19 team on 4 August 2022, for a friendly game against Albania on 10 August.

Style of play 
Mainly an attacking midfielder, Vignato can also play as a mezzala. His main characteristics are his dribbling and technical abilities.

Personal life 
Vignato's brother, Emanuel, is also a professional football player.

Career statistics

Club

References

External links

 Profile at A.C. Monza 
 
 
 
 
 
 

2004 births
Living people
Sportspeople from the Province of Verona
Footballers from Veneto
Italian people of Brazilian descent
Sportspeople of Brazilian descent
Italian footballers
Association football midfielders
A.C. ChievoVerona players
A.C. Monza players
Serie B players
Serie A players
Italy youth international footballers